The Labor-Progressive Party ran 68 candidates in the 1945 federal election. One candidate, Fred Rose, was elected.  Some of the party's candidates have their own biography pages; information about others may be found here.

Alberta

Vegreville: William Halina

William Halina was a frequent candidate for the Labor-Progressive Party and its antecedents, running twice at the federal level and twice at the provincial level. He described himself as an accountant in the 1940 election, and as a manager in 1945.

Note: Provincial elections in Alberta were determined by a single transferable ballot in this period, and Edmonton elected five members. The results listed above refer only to the first round totals.

Wetaskiwin: Henry Lundgren

Henry Lundgren was a farmer. He received 546 votes (3.00%), finishing fifth against Social Credit incumbent Norman Jaques.

References